Premabhishekam  may refer to:

 Premabhishekam (1981 film), a Telugu film starring Akkineni Nageswara Rao
 Premabhishekam (2008 film), a Telugu film starring Venu Madhav